Annie E. Holdsworth (1860–1917) was an  Anglo-Caribbean novelist; born in Jamaica; daughter of the Reverend William Holdsworth; married Eugene Lee-Hamilton in 1898. She began writing as a girl; came to London on father's death; first worked on the staff of Review of Reviews; became co-editor with Lady Henry Somerset of The Woman's Signal.

Publications
 Joanna Traill, Spinster (1894) William Heinemann, London 
 The Years That the Locust Hath Eaten (1895) William Heinemann, London 
Spindles and Oars (1896) Ward, Locke & Co., Ltd., London 
 The Gods Arrive (1898) William Heinemann, London 
 Forest Notes (in collaboration with her husband)
 The Valley of the Great Shadow (1899) William Heinemann, London
 Great Lowlands (1901)
 Michael Ross, Minister (1902) Dodd, Mead & Company, New York 
 A New Paolo and Francesca (1904) John Lane, London
 The Iron Gates (1906)
 Lady Letty Brandon (1909) John Long, London
 "Peace" and "In the Shadow of His Hand Hath He Hid Me" (1880) in The Christian Miscellany, and Family Visitor, Wesleyan Conference Office, London 
 "A Study in Oak" (1886) in Belgravia, Vol. 60, An illustrated magazine, Chatto & Windus, London 
 "When the Gorse is in Flower" (1897) in The English illustrated magazine, Volume 16, The Illustrated London News, Ltd., London

Notes

References

External links
 

English women novelists
Jamaican women novelists
19th-century English women writers
Migrants from British Jamaica to the United Kingdom
Jamaican novelists
1860 births
1917 deaths